The Meuse or Maas (or  ) is a major European river, rising in France and flowing through Belgium and the Netherlands before draining into the North Sea from the Rhine–Meuse–Scheldt delta.

History 

From 1301 the upper Meuse roughly marked the western border of the Holy Roman Empire with the Kingdom of France, after Count Henry III of Bar had to receive the western part of the County of Bar (Barrois mouvant) as a French fief from the hands of King Philip IV. In 1408, a Burgundian army led by John the Fearless went to the aid of John III against the citizens of Liège, who were in open revolt. After the battle which saw the men from Liège defeated, John ordered the drowning in the Meuse of suspicious burghers and noblemen in Liège.

The border remained stable until the annexation of the Three Bishoprics Metz, Toul and Verdun by King Henry II in 1552 and the occupation of the Duchy of Lorraine by the forces of King Louis XIII in 1633. Its lower Belgian (Walloon) portion, part of the sillon industriel, was the first fully industrialized area in continental Europe.

The Afgedamde Maas was created in the late Middle Ages, when a major flood made a connection between the Maas and the Merwede at the town of Woudrichem. From that moment on, the current Afgedamde Maas was the main branch of the lower Meuse. The former main branch eventually silted up and is today called the Oude Maasje. In the late 19th century and early 20th century the connection between the Maas and Rhine was closed off and the Maas was given a new, artificial mouth – the Bergse Maas. The resulting separation of the rivers Rhine and Maas reduced the risk of flooding and is considered to be the greatest achievement in Dutch hydraulic engineering before the completion of the Zuiderzee Works and Delta Works. The former main branch was, after the dam at its southern inlet was completed in 1904, renamed Afgedamde Maas and no longer receives water from the Maas.

The Meuse and its crossings were a key objective of the Battle of France, the Battle of Sedan and also for the last major German WWII counter-offensive on the Western Front, the Battle of the Bulge in December 1944 and January 1945.

The Meuse is represented in the documentary The River People released in 2012 by Xavier Istasse.

In July 2021, the Meuse basin was one of the many regions in Europe to experience catastrophic flooding during the 2021 European floods.

Etymology
The name Meuse is derived from the French name of the river, derived from its Latin name, Mosa, which ultimately derives from the Celtic or Proto-Celtic name *Mosā. This probably derives from the same root as English "maze", referring to the river's twists and turns.

The Dutch name Maas descends from Middle Dutch Mase, which comes from the presumed but unattested Old Dutch form *Masa, from Proto-Germanic *Masō. Modern Dutch and German Maas and Limburgish Maos preserve this Germanic form. Despite the similarity, the Germanic name is not derived from the Celtic name, judging from the change from earlier o into a, which is characteristic of the Germanic languages.

Geography

The Meuse rises in Pouilly-en-Bassigny, commune of Le Châtelet-sur-Meuse on the Langres plateau in France from where it flows northwards past Sedan (the head of navigation) and Charleville-Mézières into Belgium.

At Namur it is joined by the Sambre. Beyond Namur the Meuse winds eastwards, skirting the Ardennes, and passes Liège before turning north. The river then forms part of the Belgian-Dutch border, except that at Maastricht the border lies further to the west. In the Netherlands it continues northwards through Venlo closely along the border to Germany, then turns towards the west, where it runs parallel to the Waal and forms part of the extensive Rhine–Meuse–Scheldt delta, together with the Scheldt in its south and the Rhine in the north. The river has been divided near Heusden into the Afgedamde Maas on the right and the Bergse Maas on the left. The Bergse Maas continues under the name of Amer, which is part of De Biesbosch. The Afgedamde Maas joins the Waal, the main stem of the Rhine at Woudrichem, and then flows under the name of Boven Merwede to Hardinxveld-Giessendam, where it splits into Nieuwe Merwede and Beneden Merwede. Near Lage Zwaluwe, the Nieuwe Merwede joins the Amer, forming the Hollands Diep, which splits into Grevelingen and Haringvliet, before finally flowing into the North Sea.

The Meuse is crossed by railway bridges between the following stations (on the left and right banks respectively):
 Belgium:
 Hasselt (Belgium) – Maastricht (Netherlands)
 Netherlands:
 Weert - Roermond
 Blerick – Venlo
 Cuijk – Mook-Molenhoek
 Ravenstein – Wijchen
 's-Hertogenbosch – Zaltbommel

There are also numerous road bridges and around 32 ferry crossings.

The Meuse is navigable over a substantial part of its total length: In the Netherlands and Belgium, the river is part of the major inland navigation infrastructure, connecting the Rotterdam-Amsterdam-Antwerp port areas to the industrial areas upstream: 's-Hertogenbosch, Venlo, Maastricht, Liège, Namur. Between Maastricht and Maasbracht, an unnavigable section of the Meuse is bypassed by the  Juliana Canal.

The canalized Meuse used to be called the "Canal de l'Est — Branche Nord" but was recently rebaptized into "Canal de la Meuse". Just upstream of the town of Commercy, the Canal de la Meuse connects with the Marne–Rhine Canal by means of a short diversion canal.

The Cretaceous sea reptile Mosasaur is named after the river Meuse. The first fossils of it were discovered outside Maastricht in 1780.

Basin area

An international agreement was signed in 2002 in Ghent, Belgium, about the management of the river amongst France, Germany, Luxembourg, the Netherlands, and Belgium. Also participating in the agreement were the Belgian regional governments of Flanders, Wallonia, and Brussels (which is not in the basin of the Meuse but pumps running water into the Meuse).

Most of the basin area (approximately 36,000 km2) is in Wallonia (12,000 km2), followed by France (9,000 km2), the Netherlands (8,000 km2), Germany (2,000 km2), Flanders (2,000 km2) and Luxembourg (a few km2).

An International Commission on the Meuse has the responsibility of the implementation of the treaty.

The costs of this Commission are met by all these countries, in proportion of their own territory in the basin of the Meuse: Netherlands 30%, Wallonia 30%, France 15%, Germany 14.5%, Flanders 5%, Brussels 4.5%, Kingdom of Belgium 0.5%, and Luxembourg 0.5%.

The map of the basin area of Meuse was joined to the text of the treaty.

As for culture, as a major communication route the River Meuse is the origin of Mosan art, principally (Wallonia and France).

The first landscape painted in the Renaissance was the landscape of Meuse by Joachim Patinir. He was likely the uncle of  Henri Blès, who is sometimes defined as a Mosan landscape painter active during the second third of the 16th century (i.e. second generation of landscape painters).

Tributaries
The main tributaries of the Meuse are listed below in downstream-upstream order, with the town where the tributary meets the river:
 Dieze (near 's-Hertogenbosch)
 Aa (in 's-Hertogenbosch)
 Binnendieze (in 's-Hertogenbosch)
 Dommel (in 's-Hertogenbosch)
 Gender (in Eindhoven)
 Raam (in Grave)
 Niers (in Gennep)
 Swalm (in Swalmen)
 Rur/Roer (in Roermond)
 Wurm (in Heinsberg, Germany)
 Merzbach (in Linnich, Germany)
 Inde (in Jülich, Germany)
 Geleenbeek (near Maasbracht)
 Geul (near Meerssen)
 Geer/Jeker (in Maastricht)
  Voer/Fouron (in Eijsden)
 Berwinne/Berwijn (near Moelingen, part of Voeren)
 Ourthe (in Liège)
 Weser/Vesdre (near Liège)
 Amel/Amblève (in Comblain-au-Pont)
 Salm (in Trois-Ponts)
 Warche (near Malmedy)
 Hoyoux (in Huy)
 Mehaigne (in Wanze)
 Sambre (in Namur)
 Houyoux (in Namur)
 Bocq (in Yvoir)
 Molignée (in Anhée)
 Lesse (in Anseremme, part of Dinant)
 Viroin (in Vireux-Molhain)
 Faux (in Revin)
 Semois or Semoy (in Monthermé)
 Sormonne (in Warcq)
 Bar (near Dom-le-Mesnil)
 Chiers (in Bazeilles)
 Othain (in Montmédy)
 Vair (in Maxey-sur-Meuse)
 Mouzon (in Neufchâteau, Vosges)
 Saônelle (in Coussey)

Distributaries

The mean annual discharge rate of the Meuse has been relatively stable over the last few thousand years. One recent study estimates that average flow has increased by about 10% since 2000 BC. The hydrological distribution of the Meuse changed during the later Middle Ages, when a major flood forced it to shift its main course northwards towards the river Merwede. From then on several stretches of the original Merwede were renamed "Maas" (i.e. Meuse) and served as the primary outflow of that river. Those branches are currently known as the Nieuwe Maas and Oude Maas.

However during another series of severe floods the Meuse found an additional path towards the sea, resulting in the creation of the Biesbosch wetlands and Hollands Diep estuaries. Thereafter the Meuse split near Heusden into two main distributaries, one flowing north to join the Merwede and one flowing direct to the sea. The branch of the Meuse leading direct to the sea eventually silted up (and now forms the Oude Maasje stream), but in 1904 the canalised Bergse Maas was dug to take over the functions of the silted-up branch. At the same time the branch leading to the Merwede was dammed at Heusden (and has since been known as the Afgedamde Maas) so that little water from the Meuse entered the old Maas courses or the Rhine distributaries. The resulting separation of the rivers Rhine and Meuse is considered to be the greatest achievement in Dutch hydraulic engineering before the completion of the Zuiderzee Works and Delta Works. In 1970 the Haringvlietdam has been finished. Since then the reunited Rhine and Meuse waters have reached the North Sea either at this site or, during times of lower discharges of the Rhine, at Hook of Holland.

A 2008 study notes that the difference between summer and winter flow volumes has increased significantly in the last 100–200 years. It points out that the frequency of serious floods (i.e. flows > 1000% of normal) has increased markedly. They predict that winter flooding of the Meuse may become a recurring problem in the coming decades.

Départements, provinces and towns
The Meuse flows through the following departments of France, provinces of Belgium, provinces of the Netherlands and towns:
  Haute-Marne
  Vosges: Neufchâteau
  Meuse: Commercy, Saint-Mihiel, Verdun, Stenay
  Ardennes: Sedan, Charleville-Mézières, Givet
  Namur: Dinant, Namur
  Liège: Huy, Liège, Visé
  Limburg: Eijsden, Maastricht, Stein, Maasbracht, Roermond, Venlo, Gennep
  Limburg: Maaseik (between Stein and Maasbracht)
  North Brabant: Boxmeer, Cuijk, Grave, Ravenstein, Lith, Heusden, Aalburg, Woudrichem
  Gelderland: Maasdriel
  South Holland: Dordrecht, Maassluis, Rotterdam

Detailed route 
Main cities and tributaries will be in bold.
{| class="wikitable"
!Region
!Municipality on the left bank
!Municipality on the right bank
!Route
|-
| rowspan="18" |   
France

Grand Est Region

Haute-Marne Department
|Le Châtelet-sur-Meuse
|Le Châtelet-sur-Meuse
|Source near Pouilly-en-Bassigny
 Le Châtelet-sur-Meuse

 Premier pont de la Meuse
|-
|Dammartin-sur-Meuse
|Dammartin-sur-Meuse
| Malroy
 Pont de Malroy

 Pont du Pâtis des Vannees

 Ruisseau de Pré Chatenay
|-
|Val-de-Meuse
|Val-de-Meuse
| Meuse
 Pont de Meuse (D429 Val-de-Meuse - Dombrot-le-Sec)

 Ruisseau d'Avrecourt

 Railway bridge Culmont-Chalindrey - Toul line

 Ru d'Ouette

 Ru des Fossés

 Ruisseau de Bocheret

 Provenchères-sur-Meuse

 Pont de Val-de-Meuse (D189)

 Ruisseau des Aimeguenons

 Pont de l'A31 (A31 Nancy - Dijon)

 Ruisseau de Joncourt

 Pont de D132

 Ruisseau de l'Étange

 Ruisseau du Grand Étange
|-
|Lavilleneuve
| rowspan="2" |Val-de-Meuse
| Ruisseau de Rangecourt
 Pont de Lavilleneuve (D132)

 Le Viau
|-
|Val-de-Meuse
| Lénizeul
 Pont de D228
|-
|Bassoncourt
|Bassoncourt
| Ruisseau du Soilleron
 Pont de Bassin Court sur la Meuse (D33)
|-
|Breuvannes-en-Bassigny
|Breuvannes-en-Bassigny
| Ruisseau des Noues
 Meuvy

 Pont de Meuvy (D220)
|-
|Clefmont
|Clefmont
|/
|-
|Audeloncourt
|Audeloncourt
| Ruisseau du Grand Pré
|-
|Levécourt
|Levécourt
| Ruisseau de la Hourie
 Levécourt

 Pont de Levécourt (D131)
|-
|Huilliécourt
|Doncourt-sur-Meuse
|/
|-
|Hâcourt
| rowspan="2" |Hâcourt
| Pont de Hâcourt
|-
| rowspan="2" |Bourg-Sainte-Marie
| Hâcourt
 Ruisseau de Piot
|-
|Brainville-sur-Meuse
| Pont de Bourg-Sainte-Marie (D119)
|-
|Bourmont-entre-Meuse-et-Mouzon
| rowspan="3" |Bourmont-entre-Meuse-et-Mouzon
| Bourmont
|-
|Saint-Thiébault
| Saint-Thiébault
 Pont de Saint-Thiébault (D16)

 Ruisseau d'Illoud
|-
|Bourmont-entre-Meuse-et-Mouzon
| Pont de Gonaincourt (D119)
 Gonaincourt

 Le Mordé

 Pont de Bourmont sur la Meuse (D148)

 Goncourt
|-
|Harréville-les-Chanteurs
|Harréville-les-Chanteurs
| Railway bridges Culmont-Chalindrey - Toul line (2x)
 Harréville-les-Chanteurs

 Pont de Harréville-les-Chanteurs (D202)
|-
| rowspan="7" |   
France

Grand Est Region

Vosges Department
|Bazoilles-sur-Meuse
|Bazoilles-sur-Meuse
| Railway bridges Culmont-Chalindrey - Toul line (2x)
 Pont de Bazoilles-sur-Meuse (D74 Langres - Neufchâteau)

 Bazoilles-sur-Meuse
|-
|Neufchâteau
|Neufchâteau
| Railway bridge Culmont-Chalindrey - Toul line
 Neufchâteau

 Pont de Neufchâteau (D674 Chaumont - Neufchâteau)

 Mouzon

 Railway bridge at Neufchâteau railway station

 Pont All. Charles Péguy
|-
|Frebécourt
|Frebécourt
| Pont de Frebécourt
 Frebécourt

 La Saônelle
|-
|Coussey
|Coussey
| Coussey
 Pont de Coussey (D3)
|-
|Domrémy-la-Pucelle
|Domrémy-la-Pucelle
| Pont de Domrémy-la-Pucelle (D164 Neufchâteau - Greux)
 Domrémy-la-Pucelle
|-
|Greux
| rowspan="2" |Maxey-sur-Meuse
| Vair
|-
|Maxey-sur-Meuse
| Maxey-sur-Meuse
 Pont de D19
|-
| rowspan="81" |    France
Grand Est Region

Meuse Department
|Brixey-aux-Chanoines
|Brixey-aux-Chanoines
| Pont de Brixey-aux-Chanoines
|-
|Sauvigny
| rowspan="3" |Sauvigny
| Ruisseau de Ruppes
 Sauvigny

 Pont de Sauvigny
|-
|Montbras
|/
|-
|Sauvigny
| Pont de Traveron
 Traveron
|-
|Pagny-la-Blanche-Côte
|Pagny-la-Blanche-Côte
| Rivière de Chêtre
 Pont de Pagny-la-Blanche-Côte (D32)

 Rivière de Chêtre
|-
|Montbras
| rowspan="3" |Champougny
|/
|-
|Taillancourt
| La Haute Meuse
|-
|Champougny
| Champougny
 Pont de Champougny
|-
|Maxey-sur-Vaise
|Maxey-sur-Vaise
|/
|-
|Burey-en-Vaux
| rowspan="2" |Sepvigny
|/
|-
|Sepvigny
| Pont de Sepvigny (D145)
|-
|Neuville-lès-Vaucouleurs
|Neuville-lès-Vaucouleurs
|/
|-
|Vaucouleurs
|Chalaines
| Chalaines
 Pont de Chalaines (D960 Toul - Bure)

 La Haute Meuse
|-
| rowspan="2" |Ugny-sur-Meuse
|Rigny-la-Salle
| Le Goulot de Meuse
 Ugny-sur-Meuse
|-
|Saint-Germain-sur-Meuse
| Pont de Ugny-sur-Meuse (D36)
 Saint-Germain-sur-Meuse

 Pont de Saint-Germain-sur-Meuse (D144A)
|-
|Ugny-sur-Meuse
|Ourches-sur-Meuse
| Ourches-sur-Meuse
 Pont de D144
|-
|Pagny-sur-Meuse
|Pagny-sur-Meuse
| Pont de Pagny-sur-Meuse (N4 Paris - Strasbourg)
 Pagny-sur-Meuse

 Pont de D36
|-
|Troussey
|Troussey
| Troussey
 Pont de D36C

 Marne–Rhine Canal

 Pont de Troussey (D36)
|-
|Void-Vacon
| rowspan="2" |Sorcy-Saint-Martin
| Ruisseau de Frasne
 Le Vidus
|-
|Sorcy-Saint-Martin
| Pont de Sorcy-Saint-Martin (D10)
 Sorcy-Saint-Martin

 Pont de D144
|-
|Sorcy-Saint-Martin
|Euville
| Railway bridge Paris-Est–Strasbourg-Ville line
 Issey

 Pont d'Euville (D144)

 Canal de l'Est
|-
|Commercy
|Commercy
| Canal de l'Est
 Pont de D36

 Ruisseau de la Noue
|-
|Vignot
|Vignot
| Ruisseau d'Aulnois
 Pont de Vignot (D958 Commercy - Pont-à-Mousson)

 Vignot
|-
|Commercy
|Commercy
| Pont de Rte de Boncourt (D8A)
 Canal de l'Est
|-
|Lérouville
|Commercy
| Canal de l'Est
|-
|Boncourt-sur-Meuse
|Boncourt-sur-Meuse
| Railway bridge Lérouville - Metz line
 Pont de Boncourt-sur-Meuse
|-
|Pont-sur-Meuse
|Pont-sur-Meuse
| Pont-sur-Meuse
 Pont de Pont-sur-Meuse (D12)

 Ruisseau de Chonville
|-
|Mécrin
|Mécrin
| Pont de Mécrin (D12A)
 Mécrin
|-
|Sampigny
| rowspan="2" |Han-sur-Meuse
| Rivière de Mont
|-
| rowspan="2" |Han-sur-Meuse
| Brasseitte
 Pont du Moulin Blussot (D183)

 Ally-sur-Meuse

 Han-sur-Meuse
|-
|Saint-Mihiel
| Pont de Han-sur-Meuse (D7A)
|-
|Kœur-la-Petite
| rowspan="3" |Bislée
| Pont de D964 (Commercy - Verdun)
 Canal de l'Est
|-
|Kœur-la-Grande
| Pont de Bislée (D171)
 Bislée
|-
| rowspan="2" |Chauvoncourt
| Canal de l'Est
|-
|Chauvoncourt
| Menonville
|-
|Saint-Mihiel
|Saint-Mihiel
| Canal de l'Est
 Saint-Mihiel

 Pont de Saint-Mihiel (D901 Saint-Mihiel - Rumont)
|-
|Les Paroches
| rowspan="3" |Maizey
| Le Rehaut
 Canal de l'Est
|-
|Maizey
| Maizy
|-
|Dompcevrin
| Pont de Maizy (D101)
 Dompcevrin

 Le Hamboquin
|-
| rowspan="3" |Bannoncourt
|Rouvrois-sur-Meuse
|/
|-
|Bannoncourt
| La Petite Meuse
 Pont de Bannoncourt (D109)

 Bannoncourt

 Railway bridge LGV Est high speed line (Paris - Strasbourg)

 Ruisseau de Rompierre
|-
| rowspan="2" |Lacroix-sur-Meuse
| La Prêle
|-
|Woimbey
|/
|-
|Troyon
| rowspan="3" |Troyon
| Pont de Troyon
 Troyon
|-
|Bouquemont
|/
|-
| rowspan="3" |Tilly-sur-Meuse
|/
|-
|Tilly-sur-Meuse
| Pont de Tilly-sur-Meuse
 Tilly-sur-Meuse
|-
|Ambly-sur-Meuse
| Ruisseau de Récourt
|-
|Villers-sur-Meuse
|Villers-sur-Meuse
| Villers-sur-Meuse
 Pont de Villers-sur-Meuse (D21)
|-
|Les Monthairons
|Les Monthairons
| Pont de Rue du Lavoir
 Les Monthairons

 Le Petit Monthairon
|-
|Dieue-sur-Meuse
|Dieue-sur-Meuse
| Le Clair Fossé
 Ruisseau de la Dieue

 La Petite Meuse

 Pont de Dieue-sur-Meuse (D159)

 Dieue-sur-Meuse

 Ruisseau de Billonneau

 Ruisseau de la Dieue
|-
|Dugny-sur-Meuse
|Haudainville
| Pont de l'Autoroute A4 (Paris - Strasbourg)
 Ruisseau du Franc Ban
|-
|Belleray
|Belleray
| Pont de Belleray (D301)
 Belleray

 Canal de l'Est
|-
|Verdun
|Verdun
| Saint Vanne
 Pont de D330

 Pont de Rued'Anthouard

 Verdun

 Saint Vanne

 Pont Fernand Legay

 Canal du Puty

 Pont Chaussée

 Pont de D603 (Verdun - Metz)
|-
|Belleville-sur-Meuse
|Thierville-sur-Meuse
| Railway bridge St-Hilaire-au-Temple-Hagondange line (Verdun-Metz)
 Canal de l'Est

 La Scance

 Pont de D302B
|-
|Charny-sur-Meuse
|Bras-sur-Meuse
| Charny-sur-Meuse
 Pont de Bras-sur-Meuse (D115)
|-
|Vacherauville
|Vacherauville
| Vacherauville
|-
|Marre
| rowspan="4" |Champneuville
| Ruisseau de la Claire
|-
|Chattancourt
|/
|-
|Champneuville
| Pont de Champneuville (D214)
|-
|Cumières-le-Mort-Homme
|/
|-
|Regnéville-sur-Meuse
|Samogneux
| Regnéville-sur-Meuse
 Pont de Samogneux

 Samogneux
|-
|Forges-sur-Meuse
|Brabant-sur-Meuse
| Ruisseau de Forges
|-
|Consenvoye
|Consenvoye
| Pont de Consenvoye
 Consenvoye
|-
|Dannevoux
|Sivry-sur-Meuse
| Canal de l'Est
 Ruisseau de Guénoville

 Le Butel

 Pont de Dannevoux

 Ruisseau de Brouzel
|-
|Vilosnes-Haraumont
|Vilosnes-Haraumont
| Canal de l'Est
 Canal de l'Est

 Vilosnes-Haraumont

 Pont de Vilosnes-Haraumont (D123B)
|-
|Brieulles-sur-Meuse
|Brieulles-sur-Meuse
| Ruisseau de Domfontaine
 Brieulles-sur-Meuse

 Le Wassieu
|-
| rowspan="2" |Cléry-le-Petit
|Liny-devant-Dun
| Le Doua
 La Tranchée
|-
| rowspan="2" |Dun-sur-Meuse
| Canal de l'Est
|-
|Doulcon
| Dun-sur-Meuse
 Pont de Dun-sur-Meuse (D998)

 Doulcon

 L'Andon
|-
| rowspan="2" |Sassey-sur-Meuse
|Milly-sur-Bradon
| Ruisseau de Bradon
 Canal de l'Est
|-
| rowspan="2" |Sassey-sur-Meuse
| Sassey-sur-Meuse
 Pont de Sassey-sur-Meuse (D30)

 Ruisseau des Gaules
|-
|Mont-devant-Sassey
| Ruisseau de Mont
 Ruisseau de Longvaux
|-
|Saulmory-Villefranche
| rowspan="3" |Mouzay
| Ruisseau de Froide Fontaine
 Le Grand Mohat

 Le Petit Mohat
|-
|Wiseppe
|/
|-
| rowspan="2" |Stenay
| Canal de l'Est
|-
|Stenay
| Pont de Stenay (D947 Stenay - Montmédy)
 Stenay

 Canal de l'Est

 La Wiseppe

 Ruisseau de Cervizy
|-
|Martincourt-sur-Meuse
|Martincourt-sur-Meuse
| Pont de Martincourt-sur-Meuse
 Martincourt-sur-Meuse
|-
|Luzy-Saint-Martin
| rowspan="2" |Inor
| Ruisseau de Cesse
 Pont de Luz

 Inor

 Canal de l'Est
|-
| rowspan="2" |Pouilly-sur-Meuse
| Ruisseau du Fond de Noue
|-
|Pouilly-sur-Meuse
| Pont de Pouilly-sur-Meuse
 Pouilly-sur-Meuse
|-
|   /
France

Grand Est Region

Ardennes Department / Meuse Department
|Létanne 
|Pouilly-sur-Meuse 
| La Wame
 Létanne
|-
| rowspan="63" |   
France

Grand Est Region

Ardennes Department
|Létanne
| rowspan="4" |Mouzon
| Le Bras de Vincy
 Canal de l'Est

 Canal de l'Est
|-
|Mouzon
| Mouzon
 Pont de D19
|-
|Autrecourt-et-Pourron
| Yoncq
 Autrecourt

 Ruisseau de Brouhan
|-
|Villers-devant-Mouzon
| Villers-devant-Mouzon
 Ruisseau de la Vignette

 Ruisseau des Trois Fontaines

 Coupure de Remilly
|-
| rowspan="3" |Remilly-Aillicourt
|Douzy
|/
|-
|Remilly-Aillicourt
| Petit Remilly
 Pont de Remilly-Aillicourt (D4)

 Remilly
|-
| rowspan="2" |Bazeilles
| Chiers
 Aillicourt

 Pont de Bazeilles (D129)

 Coupure de Remilly
|-
| rowspan="2" |Noyers-Pont-Maugis
| Ruisseau de Thélonne
 Railway bridge Mohon-Thionville line (Sedan - Thionville)

 Pont-Maugis
|-
| rowspan="2" |Balan
| Ruisseau de Batelotte
|-
| rowspan="2" |Wadelincourt
| Wadelincourt
|-
| rowspan="2" |Sedan
| Pont de Sedan (N43 Sedan - Charleville-Mézières)
|-
|Sedan
| Pont de l'Avenue Philippoteaux (D8043A)
 Canal de l'Est  Pont du Boulevard Fabert

 Sedan

 Pont de Meuse

 Passerelle Saint-Vincent de Paul

 Canal de l'Est

 Pont-Neuf de Sedan
|-
| rowspan="3" |Glaire
|Floing
| Ruz de Glaire
 Floing

 Glaire

 Tour à Glaire (Glaire)

 Ruisseau de Floing

 Igles (Glaire)
|-
|Saint-Menges
| Ruisseau du Bas Caillou
 Saint-Menges
|-
| rowspan="4" |Donchery
| Ruisseau de la Falizette
 Villette (Glaire)

 Pont de Glaire (A34 Sedan - Charleville-Mézières)

 Railway bridge Mohon-Thionville line (Charleville-Mézières - Sedan)
|-
|Sedan
| Frénois (Sedan)
|-
|Donchery
| Pont de Donchery (D24)
 Donchery
|-
| rowspan="2" |Villers-sur-Bar
| Vrigne
|-
| rowspan="2" |Vrigne-Meuse
| Vrigne-Meuse
 Bar
|-
| rowspan="2" |Dom-le-Mesnil
| Canal des Ardennes
|-
| rowspan="3" |Nouvion-sur-Meuse
| Nouvion-sur-Meuse
 Pont de Nouvion-sur-Meuse (D33)
|-
|Flize
| Ruisseau des Trois Fontaines
 Flize

 Ruisseau de Boutancourt
|-
|Chalandry-Elaire
| Elaire (Chalandry-Elaire)
|-
|Les Ayvelles
| rowspan="3" |Lumes
| Lumes
|-
|Lumes
| Railway bridge Mohon-Thionville line (Charleville-Mézières - Sedan)
|-
| rowspan="3" |Villers-Semeuse
| Pont de Lumes (A34 Sedan - Charleville-Mézières)
 Ruisseau de la Truie

 Dérivation de Romery
|-
|Saint-Laurent
| Dérivation de Romery
|-
| rowspan="6" |Charleville-Mézières
| Le Theux (Charleville-Mézières)
|-
|Charleville-Mézières
| Vence
 Railway bridge Soissons - Givet line (Charleville-Mézières - Reims)

 Mohon (Charleville-Mézières)

 Canal de l'Est

 Pont de la Victoire (D8043A)

 Mézières (Charleville-Mézières)

 Pont de Pierre

 Saint-Julien (Charleville-Mézières)
|-
|Prix-lès-Mézières
| Pont de Manchester (N43 Charleville-Mézières - Sedan)
 Ruisseau du Marbay

 Manchester (Charleville-Mézières)

 Prix-lès-Mézières

 Ruisseau des Rejets

 Ruisseau de Praëlle
|-
|Warcq
| Warcq
 Pont de Warcq (D16)

 Sormonne
|-
|Charleville-Mézières
| Pont de N43 (Charleville-Mézières - Sedan)
 Passerelle Bayard

 Pont d'Arches (D8043A)

 Canal de l'Est

 Railway bridge Soissons - Givet line (Charleville-Mézières - Reims)

 Railway bridge Soissons - Givet line (Charleville-Mézières - Givet)

 Canal de l'Est

 Charleville-Mézières

 Pont de Mocy (D58)

 Montcy-Saint-Pierre (Charleville-Mézières)

 Passerelle du Mont Olympe
|-
| rowspan="3" |Montcy-Notre-Dame
| Ruisseau de la Fontaine du Prince
 Ruisseau de Soiru

 Montcy-Notre-Dame

 Pont de Montcy-Notre-Dame (D58A)

 Canal de l'Est
|-
|Aiglemont
|/
|-
| rowspan="2" |Nouzonville
|/
|-
|Nouzonville
| Nouzonville
 La Goutelle

 Ruisseau du Pré Allard

 Pont de Nouzonville (D13)
|-
|Joigny-sur-Meuse
|Joigny-sur-Meuse
| Pont de Joigny-sur-Meuse (D1A)
 Joigny-sur-Meuse
|-
|Bogny-sur-Meuse
| rowspan="2" |Bogny-sur-Meuse
| Braux
 Pont Jean-Rogissart (D1)

 Levrézy

 Bogny-sur-Meuse

 Pont Rue Jourde (D1C)

 Château Regnault
|-
| rowspan="2" |Monthermé
| Railway bridge Soissons - Givet line (Charleville-Mézières - Givet)
|-
| rowspan="3" |Monthermé
| Semois
 Monthermé

 Pont de Monthermé (D989)
|-
|Deville
| Deville
 Ruisseau de Mairupt
|-
| rowspan="2" |Laifour
| Ruisseau de la Lambrèque
|-
| rowspan="7" |Revin
| Ruisseau de la Grande Commune
 Ruisseau de la Petite Commune

 Laifour

 Railway bridge Soissons - Givet line (Charleville-Mézières - Givet)

 Pont de Laifour (D1)
|-
|Les Mazures
|/
|-
|Anchamps
| Railway bridge Soissons - Givet line (Charleville-Mézières - Givet)
 Anchamps  Pont d'Anchamps (D1B)

 Ru de la Pille

 Ruisseau des Meurtriers
|-
|Revin
| Orzy
 Pont d'Orzy

 Railway bridge Soissons - Givet line (Charleville-Mézières - Givet)

 Revin

 Pont de la Bouverie (D988 Charleville-Mézières - Givet)

 Sartnizon
|-
|Rocroi
| Pont de Saint-Nicolas
 Saint-Nicolas (Rocroi)

 Faux

 Ruisseau de Falières
|-
|Revin
| Pont de Fumay (D988 Charleville-Mézières - Givet)
 Ruisseau des Cochons
|-
| rowspan="3" |Fumay
| Ruisseau de Come
|-
|Fumay
| Ruisseau des Manises
 Railway bridge Soissons - Givet line (Charleville-Mézières - Givet)

 Ruisseau de la Folie
|-
| rowspan="3" |Haybes
| Fumay
 Pont de Fumay (D7)

 Ri d'Alyse
|-
|Haybes
| Pont de la Guerre (D7B)
 Haybes

 Ruisseau de Mohron
|-
|Fépin
| Ruisseau d'Hargnies
 Fépin
|-
|Montigny-sur-Meuse
| rowspan="3" |Vireux-Wallerand
| Risdoux
 Fond de la Mènerie

 Montigny-sur-Meuse
|-
|Vireux-Molhain
| Vireux-Molhain
 Vireux-Wallerand

 Pont de Vireux (D989)
|-
|Hierges
| Viroin
|-
| rowspan="2" |Aubrives
|Aubrives
| Aubrives
|-
| rowspan="2" |Ham-sur-Meuse
| Ham-sur-Meuse
 Pont de Ham (D46DB)
|-
| rowspan="3" |Chooz
| Chooz Nuclear Power Plant
|-
|Chooz
| Pont de Chemin de Mission
 Chooz

 Pont de Chooz
|-
| rowspan="2" |Rancennes
| Le Fond des Vaux
 Les Trois Fontaines (Chooz)
|-
| rowspan="2" |Givet
|/
|-
|Givet
| Ruisseau de Rancennes
 Givet

 Pont des Américains (D949)

 Houille
|-
| / / /
France / Belgium

Grand Est Region / Wallonia Region

Ardennes Department / Namur Province
|Givet 
|Hastière 
| Ruisseau de Mon Idée
 Heer (Hastière)
|-
| rowspan="10" |   
Belgium

Wallonia Region

Namur Province
| rowspan="2" |Hastière
|Hastière
| Heer-Agimont
 Pont de N909

 Hermeton-sur-Meuse

 Hermeton

 Ruisseau de Féron

 Hastière-Lavaux

 Hastière-par-delà

 Pont de Hastière-Lavaux (N915)

 Fond des Vaux

 Ruisseau de Bonsoy

 Ruisseau de la Roule

 Waulsort

 Ruisseau du Chestia
|-
| rowspan="2" |Dinant
| Freÿr (Hastière)
 Moniat (Hastière)
|-
| rowspan="2" |Dinant
| Anseremme
 Noyon Pré

 Railway bridge line 166 Libramont - Bertrix - Dinant

 Lesse

 Viaduc Charlemagne (N97 Ciney - Philippeville)

 Neffe

 Saint-Paul

 Dinant

 Pont Charles de Gaulle (N936)

 Leffe

 Ruisseau de Leffe

 Bouvignes-sur-Meuse
|-
| rowspan="3" |Yvoir
|/
|-
|Anhée
| Houx (Yvoir)
 Railway bridge line 154 Dinant - Namur

 Anhée

 Molignée

 Pont d'Anhée (N92 Namur - Dinant)

 Yvoir

 BocqBocq

 Hun (Anhée)

 Rouillon (Anhée)

 Pont de Rouillon (N947a)
|-
| rowspan="2" |Profondeville
| Godinne (Yvoir)
 Rivière (Profondeville)
|-
| rowspan="2" |Profondeville
| Burnot
 Burnot

 Pont de Lustin (N947)

 Profondeville

 Tailfer

 Ruisseau de Tailfer
|-
| rowspan="2" |Namur
| Boreuville (Namur)
|-
|Namur
| Pont de Wépion
 Grand Ry

 Dave

 Ruisseau de Dave

 Wépion

 Marlagne

 La Plante

 Pont de Jambes

 Jambes

 Passerelle l'Enjambée

 Sambre

 Namur

 Pont des Ardennes (N90 Namur - Liège)

 Houyoux

 Railway bridge 'Pont de Luxembourg' line 154 Dinant - Namur

 Bouge

 Pont des Grands Malades (N905)

 Viaduc du Beez (E411 Namur - Arlon)

 Beez

 Lives-sur-Meuse

 Brumagne

 Gelbresse

 Marche-les-Dames
|-
|Andenne
|Andenne
| Samson
 Samson

 Pont de Namêche (N942)

 Namêche

 Sclayn

 Pont de N968

 Ruisseau de la Loysse

 Seilles

 Andenne

 Pont d'Andenne (N921)

 Andenelle
|-
| rowspan="16" |   
Belgium

Wallonia Region

Liège Province
|Wanze
| rowspan="3" |Huy
| Gisves (Huy)
 Java (Wanze)

 Ben (Huy)

 Bas-Oha (Wanze)

 Solière

 Pont Père Pire (N643)

 Wanze

 Mehaigne
|-
|Huy
| Anhin
 Railway bridge

 Pont Roi Baudouin (N64 Tienen - Huy)

 Huy

 Hoyoux

 Pont de l'Europe
|-
| rowspan="3" |Amay
| Tihange Nuclear Power Station
 Tihange (Huy)

 Pont d'Ampsin (N684)

 Ampsin (Amay)

 Neuville-sous-Huy (Huy)
|-
|Amay
| Pont d'Ombret (N696)
 Amay

 Ombret-Rawsa
|-
| rowspan="3" |Engis
| Ruisseau d'Oxhe
 Flône (Amay)
|-
|Saint-Georges-sur-Meuse
| Pont de Hermalle
 Hermalle-sous-Huy (Engis)

 Mallieue (Saint-Georges-sur-Meuse)
|-
|Engis
| Engis
 Pont d'Engis (N639)
|-
| rowspan="2" |Flémalle
|Flémalle
| Ramioul
 Ramet

 Chokier

 Ivoz

 Pont barrage d'Ivoz-Ramet (N677)

 Flémalle
|-
| rowspan="4" |Seraing
| Ruisseau de Ville en Cour
 Railway bridge line 125A (Liers - Liège - Flémalle-Haute)

 Val
|-
|Seraing
| Troque
 Jemeppe-sur-Meuse

 Seraing

 Pont de Seraing (A604 highway Liège Airport - Seraing)
|-
|Saint-Nicolas
| Tilleur (Saint-Nicolas)
|-
| rowspan="2" |Liège
| Ougrée (Seraing)
 Sclessin (Liège)

 Pont d'Ougrée (N63 Liège - Marche-en-Famenne)

 Railway bridge cargo line
|-
| rowspan="2" |Liège
| Kinkempois
 Pont de Liège (E25 highway Liège - Luxembourg City )

 Railway bridge high speed line 3 (Liège - Aachen )

 Angleur

 Canal de l'Ourthe

 Pont de Fragnée

 Ourthe

 Passerelle la Belle Liègeoise

 Pont du Roi Albert 1er (N30)

 Pont Kennedy

 Passerelle Saucy

 Liège

 Pont des Arches (N3 Liège – Germany )

 Pont Maghin

 Pont Atlas

 Bressoux

 Jupille-sur-Meuse

 Albert Canal

 Pont - Barrage de Monsin

Monsin Island

 Canal de Monsin
|-
|Herstal
| Herstal
 Wandre (Liège)

 Pont de Wandre (N667)

 Pont d'Autorute E40 (Liège - Aachen )
|-
|Oupeye
| rowspan="2" |Visé
| Cheratte (Visé)
 Argenteau (Visé)

 Julienne

 Hermalle-sous-Argenteau (Oupeye)

 Pont de Hermalle-sous-Argenteau

 Richelle (Visé)

 Pont Trilogiport
|-
|Visé
| Visé
 Pont de Visé (N618)

 Canal de Haccourt - Visé

 Railway bridge 'Pont des Allemands Pont et barrage de Lixhe (N602)
|-
|  / /
Belgium

Wallonia Region / Flanders Region

Liège Province / Limburg Province
|Visé 
|Voeren 
| Lixhe (Visé)
 Berwinne

 Nivelle (Visé)
|-
| / /   Belgium / Netherlands
Wallonia Region / Limburg Province

Liège Province 
|Visé 
|Eijsden-Margraten 
| Voer
 Eijsden (Eijsden-Margraten)

 Lanaye (Visé)

 Bike ferry service Lanaye - Eijsden

 Canal de Lanaye

 Petit Lanaye (Visé)
|-
|  
Netherlands

Limburg Province
|Maastricht
|Maastricht
| Maastricht John F. Kennedybrug N278 (Maastricht - Aachen )

 JekerJeker

 Pedestrial bridge 'Hoge Brug''' Pedestrial bridge 'Sint-Servaasbrug Wilhelminabrug Railway bridge Maastricht Noorderbrug Zuid-Willemsvaart

 Juliana Canal

 Borgharen
|-
| rowspan="8" | / /  Belgium / Netherlands
Flanders Region / Limburg Province

Limburg 
|Lanaken 
|Maastricht 
| Smeermaas (Lanaken)
 Itteren (Maastricht)

 Neerharen (Lanaken)
|-
| rowspan="2" |Maasmechelen 
|Meerssen 
| Geul
 Uikhoven (Maasmechelen)

 Bike ferry service Uikhoven - Geulle aan de Maas

 Geulle aan de Maas (Meerssen)

 Oude Broekgraaf
|-
|Stein 
| Kotem
 Elsloo Scharbergbrug (E314  / A76  Genk  - Heerlen  - Aachen ) Stein

 Meers

 Maasmechelen

 Kirkbeek

 Maasband

 Leut (Maasmechelen)

 Ur

 Urmond (Stein)

 Berg aan de Maas (Stein)

 Car ferry service Meeswijk - Berg aan de Maas
|-
| rowspan="2" |Dilsen-Stokkem 
|Sittard-Geleen 
| Obbicht (Sittard-Geleen)
 Boyen (Dilsen-Stokkem)

 Vrietselbeek

 Bike ferry service Rotem - Grevenbicht

 Grevenbicht (Sittard-Geleen)

 Kogbeek

 Kingbeek
|-
| rowspan="2" |Echt-Susteren 
| Illikhoven (Sittard-Geleen)
 Visserweert (Sittard-Geleen)
|-
| rowspan="2" |Maaseik 
| Heppeneert (Maaseik)
 Kokkelert (Sittard-Geleen)

 Zanderbeek

 Maaseik Pater Sangersbrug (N761  / N296  Maaseik  - Susteren )
|-
| rowspan="2" |Maasgouw 
| Ohé en Laak (Maasgouw)
 Bosbeek

 Aldeneik (Maaseik)
|-
|Kinrooi 
| Ophoven (Kinrooi)
 Bike ferry service Ophoven - Ohé en Laak

 Albeek

 Stevensweert (Maasgouw)
|-
| rowspan="11" |  
Netherlands

Limburg Province
|Maasgouw
| rowspan="2" |Maasgouw
| Maasbracht
 Wessem

 Bike ferry service Thorn - Wessem

 Bike ferry service Maasbracht - Wessem Maasbrug bij Wessem (A2 Eindhoven - Maastricht) 

 Juliana Canal

 Wessem-Nederweert Canal

 Linne-Buggenum Canal
|-
| rowspan="2" |Roermond
| Vlootbeek
 Linne (Maasgouw)
|-
| rowspan="2" |Roermond
| Merum
 Bike ferry service Ool - Oolderhuuske

 Ool

 Herten

 Roermond

 Rur Louis Raemaekersbrug (N280 Roermond - Weert) Maasnielderbeek Railway bridge Buggenum (Iron Rhine Weert - Roermond)|-
| rowspan="2" |Leudal
| Linne-Buggenum Canal
 Buggenum (Leudal)

 Neerbeek

 Swalm
|-
| rowspan="2" |Beesel
| Bike ferry service Neer - Rijkel
 Rijkel (Beesel)

 Neer (Leudal)
|-
| rowspan="2" |Peel en Maas
| Beesel
 Kessel-Eik (Peel en Maas)

 Huilbeek  Kessel (Peel en Maas)

 Car ferry service Kessel - Beesel

 Tasbeek

 Reuver (Beesel)

 Scheikensbeek
|-
| rowspan="3" |Venlo
| Oijen (Peel en Maas)
 Belfeld (Venlo)

 Aalsbeek

 Steyl (Venlo)

 Car ferry service Baarlo - Steyl
|-
|Venlo
| Engerbeek
 Tegelen

 Springbeek Zuiderbrug (A73 Nijmegen - Venlo) Wijlderbeek

 Blerick Stadsbrug Venlo (N556) Railway bridge Venlo (Venlo–Eindhoven and Nijmegen–Venlo lines) Venlo

 Rijnbeek

 Stepkensbeek Noorderbrug (A67 Venlo - Duisburg )|-
| rowspan="2" |Horst aan de Maas
| Stopbeek
 Baarsdonk

 Everlose Beek

 Vorstermolenbeek

 Grubbenvorst (Horst aan de Maas)

 Velden (Venlo)

 Car ferry service Grubbenvorst - Velden

 Latbeek

 Hasselt (Venlo)

 Salderbeek

 Houthuizen (Horst aan de Maas)

 Molenbeek van Lotum

 Lomm (Venlo)

 Wielder (Horst aan de Maas)

 Tassbeek

 Lottum (Horst aan de Maas)

 Car ferry service Lottum - Lomm

 Pedestrian ferry service Lottum - Arcen

 Arcen (Venlo)

 Aarsbeek

 Broekhuizen (Horst aan de Maas)

 Car ferry service Broekhuizen - Arcen

 Molenbeek

 Broekhuizenvorst (Horst aan de Maas)

 Rode Beek
|-
| rowspan="2" |Bergen
| Geldernsch-Nierkanaal
|-
|Venray
| Wellerlooi (Bergen)
 Blitterswijck (Venray)

 Bike ferry service Blitterswijck - Wellerlooi

 Sohr Koninginnebrug N270 (Venray - Eindhoven) Well (Bergen)

 Wanssum (Venray)

 Grote Molenbeek

 Oostrumsche Beek

 Geijsteren (Venray)
|-
| rowspan="3" |  /
Netherlands

Limburg Province / North Brabant province
| rowspan="5" |Land van Cuijk 
|Bergen 
| Maashees
 Ayensebeek

 Aijen (Bergen)

 Vierlingsbeek (Land van Cuijk)

 Car ferry service Vierlingsbeek - Bergen

 Bergen

 Molenbeek

 Heukelomsebeek

 Heukelom (Bergen)

 Eckeltse Beek

 Rekgraaf

 Afferden (Bergen)

 Car ferry service Sambeek - Afferden

 Sint-Jansbeek

 Sambeek (Land van Cuijk)
|-
|Gennep 
| Boxmeer (Land van Cuijk) Maasbrug van Boxmeer (A77 Boxmeer - Cologne ) Heijen (Gennep)

 Gennep Maasbrug van Gennep (N264 Gennep - Veghel) Niers

 Oeffeltsche Raam

 Milsbeek (Gennep)

 Tielebeek
|-
|Mook en Middelaar 
| Sint-Agatha (Land van Cuijk)
 Middelaar (Mook en Middelaar)

 Virdsche Graaf

 Cuijk (Land van Cuijk)

 Car ferry service Cuijk - Middelaar

 Mooks Kanaal

 Mook (Mook en Middelaar)

 Katwijk (Land van Cuijk) Railway bridge Mook (Nijmegen–Venlo line) Molenhoek (Mook en Middelaar)
|-
| rowspan="8" |  /
Netherlands

Gelderland / North Brabant province
|Heumen 
| Maas–Waal Canal
 Heumen Maasbrug van Heumen (A73 Nijmegen - Venlo) Overasselt (Heumen)

 Tochtsloot

 Grave (Land van Cuijk) John S. Thompsonbrug (N324 Grave - Nijmegen) Nederasselt (Heumen)

 Raam
|-
| rowspan="2" |Wijchen 
| Balgoij (Wijchen)
|-
| rowspan="3" |Oss 
| Keent (Oss)
 Neerloon (Oss)

 Niftrik (Wijchen) Maasbrug van Ravenstein (A50 Nijmegen - Eindhoven) Ravenstein (Oss)

 Bike ferry service Ravenstein - Niftrik Railway bridge 'Edithbrug' (Tilburg-Nijmegen line) Neerlangel (Oss)

 Demen (Oss)

 Batenburg (Wijchen)

 Bike ferry service Demen - Batenburg

 Dieden (Oss)
|-
|West Maas en Waal 
| Nieuwe Wetering
 Appeltern (West Maas en Waal)

 De Vliet

 Car ferry service Appeltern - Megen

 Megen (Oss)

 Car ferry service Maasbommel - Megen-West

 Maasbommel (West Maas en Waal)

 Burgemeester Delenkanaal

 Boveneind (Oss)

 Berghuizen (West Maas en Waal)

 Oijen (Oss)

 Car ferry service Oijen - Nieuwe Schans

 Greffeling (West Maas en Waal)

 Alphen (West Maas en Waal)

 Lithoijen (Oss)

 Lith (Oss)

 Moordhuizen (West Maas en Waal)

 Car ferry service Lith - Moordhuizen
|-
| rowspan="3" |Maasdriel 
| Voorne (Maasdriel)
 Heerewaarden (Maasdriel)

 Bike ferry service Heerewaarden - Lithse Ham

 Maren-Kessel (Oss)

 Sint Andries canal

 Car ferry service Alem - Maren-Kessel

 't Wild (Oss)

 Kerkdriel (Maasdriel)

 Hertogswetering

 Hoefgraaf
|-
|'s-Hertogenbosch 
| Gewande ('s-Hertogenbosch)
 Hoenzadriel (Maasdriel)

 Máxima Canal

 Empel ('s-Hertogenbosch) Maasbrug van Empel (A2 's-Hertogenbosch - Utrecht) 's-Hertogenbosch Railway bridge 'Hedelse spoorbrug' (Utrecht–Boxtel line) Prinses Irenebrigadebrug Hedel (Maasdriel)

 Oude Dieze

 Dieze

 Bokhoven ('s-Hertogenbosch)

 Ammerzoden (Maasdriel)
|-
| rowspan="2" |Heusden 
| Well (Maasdriel)
 Zooislagen Buitendijkse Loop
|-
|Zaltbommel 
| Car ferry service Bern - Herpt
 Bern (Zaltbommel)

 Heusden

 Heusden Canal
|-
| rowspan="3" |  
Netherlands

North Brabant province
|Heusden
| rowspan="3" |Altena
| Maasbrug van Heusden (N267 Heusden - Giessen) Heesbeen (Heusden)

 Genderen (Altena)

 Doeveren (Heusden)
|-
|Waalwijk
| Afwateringskanaal 's-Hertogenbosch - Drongelen
 Drongelen (Altena)

 Waalwijk

 Car ferry service Drongelen - Waalwijk

 Car ferry service Dussen - Capelle

 Dussen (Altena)
|-
|Geertruidenberg
| Peerenboom (Altena) Keizersveerbrug (A27 Breda - Utrecht) Raamsdonksveer (Geertruidenberg)

 Geertruidenberg

 Nieuwe Merwede

Mouth into the North Sea
|}

Mention in patriotic songs
The Meuse (Maas) is mentioned in the first stanza of Germany's old national anthem, the Deutschlandlied. However, since its re-adoption as national anthem in 1952, only the third stanza of the Deutschlandlied has been sung as the German national anthem, the first and second stanzas being omitted. This was confirmed after German reunification in 1991 when only the third stanza was defined as the official anthem. The lyrics written in 1841 describe a then–disunited Germany with the river as its western boundary, where King William I of the Netherlands had joined the German Confederation with his Duchy of Limburg in 1839. Though the duchy's territory officially became an integral part of the Netherlands by the 1867 Treaty of London, the text passage remained unchanged when the Deutschlandlied'' was declared the national anthem of the Weimar Republic in 1922.

The name of the rivers also forms part of the title of "Le Régiment de Sambre et Meuse", written after the French defeat in the Franco-Prussian War of 1870, and a popular patriotic song for the rest of the 19th century and into the 20th.

See also
 1930 Meuse Valley fog

References

External links

 Peace Palace Library's Bibliography on Water Resources and International Law regarding Meuse River
 Peace Palace Library's Bibliography on Water Resources and International Law regarding Meuse River

 
Belgium–Netherlands border
International rivers of Europe
Rivers of the Rhine–Meuse–Scheldt delta
Rivers of France
Rivers of Belgium
Rivers of the Netherlands
Rivers of Flanders
Rivers of Wallonia
Rivers of Grand Est
Rivers of Ardennes (department)
Rivers of Haute-Marne
Rivers of Meuse (department)
Rivers of Vosges (department)
Rivers of Liège Province
Rivers of Namur (province)
Rivers of Gelderland
Rivers of Limburg (Netherlands)
Rivers of North Brabant
Rivers of South Limburg (Netherlands)
Rivers of the Ardennes (Belgium)
Rivers of the Ardennes (France)
Transport in 's-Hertogenbosch
Transport in Maastricht
Transport in Roermond
Transport in Sittard-Geleen
Transport in Venlo
Geography of Liège
Geography of Namur (city)
Border rivers